The 1971 NASCAR Winston Cup Series season began on Sunday January 10 and ended on Sunday November 20. Richard Petty was the champion for this Winston Cup season. After 20 years of being named the NASCAR Grand National Series, R. J. Reynolds first became the primary sponsor in a decade where the growing anti-tobacco movement banned its advertisement on television and motorsports was the ideal place to place their advertisements. Through NASCAR, Winston merchandise was unveiled to live viewers of the races (since they were not allowed to advertise to a televised audience). This kind of merchandise would also be given out at stores that sold cigarettes in subsequent years. Race car drivers were encouraged to smoke cigarettes (when not racing) until the mid-2000s brought in strict drug testing policies in addition to a smoking cessation program by Nicorette, a GlaxoSmithKline brand (Goody's Headache Powders, a long-time NASCAR sponsor, is a GSK brand;  as of 2023, GSK sponsors both the Truck series race, and the spring Cup race at Martinsville Speedway).

Season recap

Note:  Some races were combined races for Grand American and Grand National cars.  Races marked Combined Races were won by Grand American cars.  The driver who finished first among Grand National cars is listed.

Notable Races

Motor Trend 500

The 1971 Motor Trend 500 was the first official race in NASCAR's Winston Cup era. Drivers had to contend with 191 laps on a 2.620 mile road course at Riverside International Raceway in Riverside, California. Ray Elder won the race.

96- Ray Elder
12- Bobby Allison
72- Benny Parsons (2 laps behind)
71- Bobby Isaac (2 laps behind)
48- James Hylton (6 laps behind)
39- Friday Hassler (7 laps behind)
32- Kevin Terris (7 laps behind)
26- Carl Joiner (22 laps behind)
19- Henley Gray (22 laps behind)
24- Cecil Gordon (24 laps behind)

Daytona 500

The 12th annual Daytona 500 was run on February 14 at Daytona International Speedway in Daytona Beach, Florida. A. J. Foyt won the pole and Richard Petty would win his third Daytona 500.

Top Ten Results

43- Richard Petty
11- Buddy Baker
21- A. J. Foyt
17- David Pearson (1 lap behind)
99- Fred Lorenzen (1 lap behind)
31- Jim Vandiver (2 laps behind)
22- Dick Brooks (2 laps behind)
20- Jim Hurtubise (3 laps behind)
48- James Hylton (3 laps behind)
71- Bobby Isaac (3 laps behind)

Miller High Life 500

The Miller High Life 500 was run on February 28 at Ontario Motor Speedway. A. J. Foyt would win this race after more than three hours of racing (from the pole position).

21- A. J. Foyt
11- Buddy Baker
43- Richard Petty
71- Bobby Isaac
22- Dick Brooks
98- LeeRoy Yarbrough
96- Ray Elder
55- Tiny Lund
72- Benny Parsons
48- James Hylton

Greenville 200
The Greenville 200 was the first live flag-to-flag telecast of a NASCAR race. The race was run on Saturday, April 10 at Greenville-Pickens Speedway and was carried live on ABC with Jim McKay, Chris Economaki and Ken Squier. Bobby Isaac won the race.

71- Bobby Isaac, 1970 Dodge Charger
17- David Pearson (2 laps behind), 1970 Ford Purolator
22- Dick Brooks (2 laps behind), 1969 Dodge Charger 
2- Dave Marcis (2 laps behind), 1969 Dodge Charger 
72- Benny Parsons (2 laps behind), 1969 Ford 
48- James Hylton (4 laps behind), 1971 Ford 
43- Richard Petty (4 laps behind), 1970 Plymouth Road Runner
39- Friday Hassler (5 laps behind), 1969 Chevrolet
06- Neil Castles (5 laps behind), 1969 Dodge Charger 
20- Elmo Langley (7 laps behind), 1970 Mercury

Rebel 400

The Rebel 400 was run on May 2 at Darlington Raceway in Darlington, South Carolina. Donnie Allison won the pole and Buddy Baker would win his third Rebel 400.

11- Buddy Baker
22- Dick Brooks
2- Dave Marcis
21- Donnie Allison
31- Jim Vandiver
49- G. C. Spencer
70- J. D. McDuffie
39- Friday Hassler
76- Ben Arnold
64- Elmo Langley

Winston 500

The Winston 500 was run on May 16 at Alabama International Motor Speedway in Talladega, Alabama. Donnie Allison won the pole and won the race. He defeated Bobby by some seconds.

21- Donnie Allison
12- Bobby Allison
11- Buddy Baker
6- Pete Hamilton (1 lap behind)
99- Fred Lorenzen (1 lap behind)
31- Jim Vandiver (2 laps behind)
48- James Hylton (3 laps behind)
90- Bill Dennis (5 laps behind)
71- Dave Marcis (7 laps behind)
68- Larry Baumel (10 laps behind)

World 600

The World 600 was run on May 30 at Charlotte Motor Speedway in Concord, South Carolina. Charlie Glotzbach won the pole and Bobby Allison would win the 1971 World 600 (defeating his brother).

12- Bobby Allison
21- Donnie Allison
6- Pete Hamilton (1 lap behind)
43- Richard Petty (2 laps behind)
99- Fred Lorenzen (5 laps behind)
11- Buddy Baker (6 laps behind)
72- Benny Parsons (8 laps behind)
39- Friday Hassler (9 laps behind)
2- Dave Marcis (10 laps behind)
22- Dick Brooks (10 laps behind)

Myers Brothers 250

The 1971 Myers Brothers 250 was a NASCAR Winston Cup Series event that took place on August 6, 1971, at Bowman Gray Stadium in the American community of Winston-Salem, North Carolina.
Due to the reduced sponsorship money being given out by the "Big Three" automobile companies in Detroit, NASCAR decided to hold six of their smaller Winston Cup Series races in conjunction with the "minor league" NASCAR Grand American Series.

As Bobby Allison was not racing in a Grand National car, he never received credit in that series, but was credited with a Grand American Series ("pony" cars) win.  Richard Petty, who finished second in a Grand National car, was never given credit for the class win.  Under current rules used in various combination races among cars in NASCAR series, Petty would be credited with a series win.

49-Bobby Allison
43-Richard Petty
14-Jim Paschal
87-Buck Baker
11-Dave Marcis
55-Tiny Lund
15-Wayne Andrews
25-Jabe Thomas
86-David Ray Boggs
30-Walter Ballard

Yankee 400

The Yankee 400 was run on August 15 at Michigan International Speedway in Brooklyn, Michigan. Pete Hamilton won the pole and Bobby Allison would win the 1971 Yankee 400.

12- Bobby Allison
43- Richard Petty
11- Buddy Baker
60- Maynard Troyer
18- Joe Frasson
24- Cecil Gordon
88- Ron Keselowski
48- James Hylton
25- Jabe Thomas
06- Neil Castles

Delaware 500

The 1971 Delaware 500 is a NASCAR Winston Cup Series race that took place on October 17, 1971. Richard Petty defeated Charlie Glotzbach by more than one lap in front of eighteen thousand people.

43- Richard Petty
98- Charlie Glotzbach
71- Bobby Isaac
12- Bobby Allison
90- Bill Dennis
57- David Ray Boggs
91- Richard D. Brown
64- Elmo Langley
30- Walter Ballard
48- James Hylton

Final Point Standings

 Richard Petty 4435
 James Hylton 4071
 Cecil Gordon 3677
 Bobby Allison 3636
 Elmo Langley 3356
 Jabe Thomas 3200
 Bill Champion 3058
 Frank Warren 2886
 J. D. McDuffie 2862
 Walter Ballard 2633

Other information
 This was the first season where NASCAR's premier racing series was called the Winston Cup. All previous seasons were known as either Grand National or Strictly Stock.

See also
1971 NASCAR Winston West Series

References
 1971 Greenville 200
 1971 Rebel 400(  2009-07-21)
 1971 World 600
 1971 Winston 500(  2009-08-17)
 1971 Motor Trend 500
 1971 Yankee 400
 1971 Miller High Life 500
 NASCAR Smoking Cessation Program

 
NASCAR Cup Series seasons